Nationality words link to articles with information on the nation's poetry or literature (for instance, Irish or France).

Events

Works published

United Kingdom
 Joseph Addison, The Works of Joseph Addison, edited by Thomas Tickell
 John Dennis, Original Letters, Familiar, Moral and Critical. In Two Volumes, including literary criticism
 Charles Gildon, Laws of Poetry, criticism
 Alexander Pennecuik, An Ancient Prophecy Concerning Stock-Jobbing, and the Conduct of the Directors of the South-Sea-Company
 Thomas Parnell, Night-Piece on Death a notable work by one of the Graveyard poets
 Matthew Prior, Colin's Mistakes, published anonymously (died this year)
 Allan Ramsay, Poems
 Jonathan Swift:
 The Bubble
 Letter of Advice to a Young Poet
 Thomas Tickell, Kensington Garden, published anonymously this year, although the book states "1722" (see also Joseph Addison, above)

Other
 Barthold Heinrich Brockes, Earthly Pleasure in God, Germany

Births
Death years link to the corresponding "[year] in poetry" article:
 March 17 – James Dance, pseudonym of James Dance (died 1774), English poet, playwright, actor and cricketer
 March 19 – Tobias Smollett (died 1771), Scottish-born physician, novelist and poet
 July 9 – Johann Nikolaus Götz (died 1781), German poet
 August 21 – Lucretia Wilhelmina van Merken (died 1789), Dutch poet and playwright
 September 17 – Johann Adolf Schlegel (died 1793), German poet
 October 5 – William Wilkie (died 1772), Scottish poet and agriculturalist
 November 9 – Mark Akenside (died 1770), English poet
 December 25 – William Collins (died 1759), English poet
 date not known
 James Grainger (died 1766), Scottish-born physician, poet and translator
 Robert Potter (died 1804), English translator, poet and cleric

Deaths
Birth years link to the corresponding "[year] in poetry" article:
 September 18 – Matthew Prior (born 1664), English poet (see "Works", above)
 February 24 – John Sheffield, 1st Duke of Buckingham and Normanby (born 1648), English statesman and poet
 date not known – Rupa Bhavani (born 1621), Indian, Kashmiri-language poet

See also

 Poetry
 List of years in poetry
 List of years in literature
 18th century in poetry
 18th century in literature
 Augustan poetry
 Scriblerus Club

Notes

 "A Timeline of English Poetry" Web page of the Representative Poetry Online Web site, University of Toronto

18th-century poetry
Poetry